George Albert Smith (1870–1951) was the eighth president of The Church of Jesus Christ of Latter-day Saints (LDS Church).

George Albert Smith may also refer to:
 George A. Smith (1817–1875), American leader in the Latter Day Saint movement and the LDS Church
 George Albert Smith (filmmaker) (1864–1959), English hypnotist, astronomer and cinema technology pioneer
 George Albert Smith Jr. (1905–1969), American professor at Harvard Business School

See also
 Albert Smith (disambiguation)
 George Albert (disambiguation)
 George Smith (disambiguation)